John Piper is a UK born author, active in market analysis and the psychology of trading.

Biography
John Piper has been involved with markets since his early twenties. In the late 1980s he started to trade options full-time and did so right through the Crash of 1987 - an experience that prepared him to take full advantage of the current economic crisis and today's volatile markets.

Since 1989 John Piper has been the editor of The Technical Trader, the leading newsletter in the UK for those who trade in futures and options markets worldwide.

Books
 1998: The Way to Trade: Discover Your Successful Trading Personality Harriman Modern Classics - 
 2006: Financial Cataclysm Now! How to Survive the Coming Downturn Zena Press - 
 2007: Binary Betting: an Introductory Guide to Making Money with Binary Bets Harriman House - 
 2009: Binary Trading: Profitable Strategies for Binary Betting Harriman House - 
 2012: The Business of Trading: 101 Steps to Trading Success Harriman House -

DVD courses
 2007: Binary Mastery
 2010 The FTSE Seminar

References

External links
 
 

1953 births
Living people
British financial writers
20th-century British writers
21st-century British writers